Novelette may also refer to:

 Novelette (ballet), a solo modern dance work choreographed by Martha Graham
 Novelette (music), a short piece of lyrical music
 Novelette (literature), a work of narrative prose fiction that is longer than a short story but shorter than a novella
 Novelette, the central character of Trey Anthony's 2001 play Da Kink in My Hair